Allocotocera is a genus of flies in the family of Mycetophilidae. Two of the species are found in Europe.

Species
Allocotocera coxiponensis Lane, 1952
Allocotocera flavicoxa Freeman, 1951
Allocotocera nigricoxa Freeman, 1951
Allocotocera pulchella (Curtis, 1837)
Allocotocera scheria Chandler, 2006.

References

Mycetophilidae
Bibionomorpha genera